The 170th Infantry Regiment was an infantry regiment in the Imperial Japanese Army. The regiment was attached to the 21st Army until 1940. The regiment participated during the Second Sino-Japanese War and World War II. In 1941, it formed the basis of the 21st Independent Mixed Brigade.

Organization 
 1st Battalion
 2nd Battalion
 3rd Battalion

References

Infantry Regiments (Imperial Japanese Army)